Constance "Connie" Elaine Clayton, PhD, EdD (born 1933) is an American educator and civic leader. From 1982 to 1993, she was the Superintendent of the School District of Philadelphia.  Clayton holds distinctions of (i) being the first woman and (ii) the first African American to serve as Superintendent of Schools in Philadelphia.  In 1992, the University of Pennsylvania Graduate School of Education established the Constance E. Clayton Professorship, the first professorship to be established in the name of an African American woman at an Ivy League institution, and the second such professorship in the United States.  Clayton is known for her "forceful persona" and "no-nonsense" approach and for her advocacy for children.

Early life and education
Clayton was born in 1933 in Philadelphia to Levi Clayton (1906–1987) and Williabell Harris (maiden; 1910–2004). Her parents, who married February 19, 1931, in Philadelphia,  separated September 1935, when she was two, and legally divorced on April 4, 1952.  Constance was raised by her mother, Willabell Clayton, and maternal grandmother Sarah Harris. She has said of her childhood that "I had everything I needed and most of the things I wanted. I really was very fortunate." Her mother took her to art museums, establishing a lifelong love for art. Clayton attended Paul Laurence Dunbar Elementary School and the Philadelphia High School for Girls. She credits lawyer Sadie Tanner Mossell Alexander, the wife of civil rights attorney Raymond Pace Alexander, as one of her mentors.

She received her B.A. and M.A. at Temple University in 1955, where she specialized in elementary school administration. She earned her Ph.D. from Pennsylvania State University in 1974, and a Doctor of Education degree (EdD) in educational administration from the University of Pennsylvania Graduate School of Education in 1981.

She was the national social action chairman of the Delta Sigma Theta sorority.

Teaching career 
From 1955 to 1964 Clayton worked as a fourth grade teacher in the School District of Philadelphia at the William H. Harrison School in North Philadelphia.  From 1964 to 1969 she designed social studies curricula for elementary grades. From 1969 to 1971 she was the head of a new African and Afro-American Studies program, addressing issues for students of all ages.

During 1971-1972, she became director of the Women's Bureau for the Middle Atlantic States, working for the United States Department of Labor in Washington, D.C. to support women’s employment status and pay equity.

From 1973 to 1983, she was first the director and then the associate superintendent of the Early Childhood Program for the Philadelphia school system. Under her direction, the program was seen as a national model. During this time she also went back to school, earning her Ph.D. in 1974, and her EdD in educational administration from the University of Pennsylvania’s Graduate School of Education in 1981.

Superintendent of Schools 
In 1983, Constance Clayton defeated 83 other candidates to become the superintendent of the School District of Philadelphia.  She was Philadelphia’s first African American woman superintendent.  She served in the position from 1983 to 1993.   She also became president-elect of the national Council of Great City Schools.  The Philadelphia school system was the sixth largest school system in the United States, employing approximately 24,500 teachers, administrators, and support staff at over 250 locations. Challenges included the extreme poverty of much of the student body and a budget deficit.

Clayton set a number of goals for the city’s schools, including balancing the budget, standardizing the curriculum, and attracting private sector support. At the end of her first 8 years as superintendent, the school system had been largely successful in meeting those goals.

Clayton was a moral voice in support of children in the education system, emphasizing that "Somebody had better step forward and be the advocate for kids." She emphasized the need for federal, state, and city governments to all make a "concrete investment" in education.  She recognized the difficulties faced by many children, and promoted programs to address their needs, including the Homeless Student Initiative, America 2000, a broader sexual education program, and acceptance of pregnant students who wish to graduate. "We must educate the kids born into poverty and despair.  We must value all kids and not just a select few." "We have enormously talented kids who have a great deal of potential, children who are aspiring."  According to Philadelphia Inquirer reporter Claude Lewis, Clayton "made meaningful improvement and provided a measure of hope for students and teachers alike who live with despair."   She retired in 1993.

Philadelphia Museum of Art 
Since her retirement, Constance Clayton has continued to be active in the community and to serve on the boards of a number of institutions.  These include the Philadelphia Museum of Art, where she serves on the board of trustees. In 2000 she founded the museum's African American Collections Committee.  Her work with the museum has led to the creation of the exhibits Treasures of Ancient Nigeria (1982) and  Represent: 200 Years of African American Art (2014).

Awards and honors
 17 honorary doctorates
 Rockefeller Foundation fellowship, c. 1974
 Gimbel Award
 Rev. Jesse F. Anderson Memorial Award from Widener University
 Distinguished Daughters of Pennsylvania Award 
 Humanitarian Service Award from the Philadelphia Commission on Human Relations
 Star Community Commitment to Education Award, 2008, from the Philadelphia Education Fund

The Constance E. Clayton Professorship 
The Constance E. Clayton Professorship in Urban Education was established in 1992 at the University of Pennsylvania Graduate School of Education.  It received support from the William Penn Foundation, Cigna, The Vanguard Group, and PNC Bank.  Constance Clayton was the first African American woman to have a professorship named for her at an Ivy League institution.  U. Penn also established, in her honor, The Clayton Lecture Series on Urban Education.

|-

Notes and references

Notes

References 

1933 births
Living people
Educators from Philadelphia
American women educators
Temple University alumni
Pennsylvania State University alumni
Philadelphia High School for Girls alumni
University of Pennsylvania Graduate School of Education alumni
Rockefeller Fellows
African-American people